The flag of the unrecognised and now-defunct State of Katanga, a regime in the southern part of the Democratic Republic of the Congo that briefly existed during the Congo Crisis, was designed by an architect Louis Dressen, former manager of Banque du Congo Belge in Elisabethville (modern-day Lubumbashi).

Components of the flag had to represent the motto of Katanga: Force, espoir et Paix dans la Prospérité. The red component is for power, green for hope, white for peace and the croisettes (based on the area's traditional currency, the Katanga cross) for prosperity.

Despite an official guide having been published as to the flag's design and dimensions, due to the state of affairs in the region at the time, this was not enforced, and variants were common, including ones of different ratios (such as 2:3 or 3:5), ones with golden coloured croisettes, and ones where the croisettes were replaced with saltires (diagonal crosses).

See also
Flag of the Democratic Republic of the Congo
Katanga cross

References

Obsolete national flags
Flag
State of Katanga
Flags introduced in 1960
Flags with crosses